Rabiah ibn Kab was a companion of Muhammad.

Biography 
He was a poor man from the tribe of Banu Aslam and he converted to Islam at an early age, requesting of his own accord to be a servant of Muhammad so as to be in his company as much as possible. He resided in Suffah of the mosque with other poor Muslims, who were called the "guests of Islam" and received charity from Muhammad.

Muhammad arrived in Madina on Friday, 12th of Rabiul Awwal, 1AH. The first task upon his arrival was the construction of Muhammad’s mosque- at the site of the camel’s kneeling. The site belonged to two orphan boys- it was previously a graveyard of the polytheists. The Muslims began the construction of the Mosque (Masjidun Nabi). The mosque contained Muhammad's house. It also had a place for the Muslims who had neither family nor home (As-Sufa). Rabi’ah Ibn Ka’b Al Aslami was amongst the companions who lived in As-Sufa. 

Rabi’ah Ibn Ka’b Al Aslami was a young, poor companion who lived in Suffa (part of the Masjid in Madina reserved for the poor homeless companions). He devoted himself to the service of Muhammad. He used to pour the water for Muhammad's wudu and do other services. He was so eager to serve Muhammad that he would sleep by the front door of his house so if Muhammad called him, he could rush to his service immediately. Once Muhammad called him and Rabi’ah replied with “Labaik Ya Rasool Allah wa Sa’daik”. Muhammad wished to reward and repay Rabi’ah for his services and asked him what he would like. Rabi’ah asked for some time to think over what he wanted. As he was poor, he thought of asking for wealth but then changed his mind. When Muhammad asked him what he wanted the second time, Rabi’ah said “Murafaqatuka fil Jannah Ya Rasool Allah” (I want your companionship in Paradise of Messenger of Allah). Muhammad asked him if he wanted anything else but Rabi’ah said no, that is all he wished for so Muhammad told him to help himself by increasing in prostration. Rabi’ah was always seen in prostration after that. 

Muhammad arranged his marriage to a good family and gave him land next to Abu Bakr’s land. Once, Rabi’ah and Abu Bakr got into an argument over a palm tree in their lands. Abu Bakr, in the heat of the argument, swore at Rabi’ah and felt immediate regret. He told Rabi’ah to say the swear word back to him as an act of retaliation but Rabi’ah refused. Abu Bakr demanded Rabi’ah swears at him with the same word but Rabi’ah still refused so Abu Bakr got angry and said he would go and complain to Muhammad. Rabi’ah’s people from Banu Aslam came to Rabi’ah’s defence and were shocked by Abu Bakr’s actions that he swears and then he goes to complain to Muhammad. Rabi’ah told them to go away and that if Abu Bakr sees them, he might get angry and as a result, Muhammad would get angry and therefore Allah would get angry and thus Rabi’ah would be destroyed. Rabi’ah followed Abu Bakr and arrived at Muhammad’s location. Muhammad asked Rabi’ah what the matter was. Rabi’ah said that Abu Bakr swore at him and wanted him to swear back to make it even but he refused. Muhammad said he did well and guided him to say to Abu Bakr “Ghafar Allahu Lak” (May Allah forgive you) instead. Abu Bakr began to cry. Muhammad ruled the palm tree belonged to Rabi’ah Ibn Ka’b. 

Companions of the Prophet